Rosenborg, formerly Uranienborgveien is at tram stop on the Briskeby Line of the Oslo Tramway. It is located in Josefines gate, close to its street junction with Bogstadveien. It serves the neighborhoods , Hegdehaugen and Uranienborg in the West End of Oslo. The station is preceded and succeeded by Bogstadveien and Briskeby, respectively.  The station used to be near the junction of Holtegata and Uranienborgveien streets, but it was moved towards Hegdehaugen and Rosenborg in 2009, after the line had been upgraded and reconstructed. In 2014, it was moved even further towards Rosenborg, and consequently renamed. In the same move, the former Rosenborg stop was replaced with the newly established Bogstadveien stop, situated further north, closer to Majorstuen.

References

Oslo Tramway stations in Oslo